Chilliwack River Provincial Park is a provincial park in British Columbia, Canada, located on the north side of the Chilliwack River to the southeast of the City of Chilliwack in the province's Lower Mainland region.

When first established in 1961, the park comprised approximately 65 acres.  Boundaries were decreased in 1970, then increased back to 65 acres later that year.  The boundary was redrawn again in 2004, with the park now comprising 21 hectares.

References

External links

Provincial parks of British Columbia
Lower Mainland
1961 establishments in British Columbia
Protected areas established in 1961